Salinimicrobium nanhaiense is a Gram-negative, facultatively anaerobic and rod-shaped bacterium from the genus of Salinimicrobium which has been isolated from sediments from the South China Sea.

References

Flavobacteria
Bacteria described in 2020